Christmas is an album by Elaine Paige, released in 1986, the fifth and final album to be released on the label until the release of Piaf in 1994. The album reached number 27 in the UK album charts. The album was re-issued on CD in 2006.

It was the fourth and last of Paige's albums to be produced by Tony Visconti, after Stage (1983), Cinema (1984) and Love Hurts (1985).

The album was recorded at Visconti's Good Earth Studios in September 1986. In contrast to Paige's musical theatre background, a feature of all her Visconti-produced recordings is the pop arrangements.
"Ave Maria" had been recorded and released as a single in 1982, it was also included on the 2-CD set Save The Children - Christmas Carols and Festive Songs in 1988. 
"A Winter's Tale" was written by Wombles producer Mike Batt and Paige's then partner, lyricist Tim Rice and had been originally recorded by David Essex. Rice also contributed a voiceover as Santa on the final track. Tommy Körberg who, in 1986, was starring alongside Paige in the London production of Chess performed the Bing Crosby part on "Peace On Earth/Little Drummer Boy".

The album cover artwork featured Paige in a fake fur stole decorated with mistletoe. The reverse cover showed another 12 shots from the photoshoot where Paige makes a variety of humorous poses.

Track listing

 "Walking in the Air" - 3.29 (Howard Blake)
 "Peace on Earth" - 3.01 (Buz Kohan, Larry Grossman, Ian Fraser) / The Little Drummer Boy (Harry Simeone, Henry V. Onorati, Katherine K. Davis)
 "The Little Drummer Boy" 
 "Father Christmas Eyes" - 4.36 (Julia Downes, Johnny Warman, Don Black)
 "Ave Maria" - 3.52 (Charles Gounod)
 "Wishin' On a Star" - 3.52 (Billie Calvin)
 "Santa Claus is Coming to Town" - 2.50 (Haven Gillespie, J. Fred Coots)
 "Coventry Carol" - 2.28 (Traditional)
 "The Coldest Night of the Year (Incredible Phat)" - 4.45 (Jimmy Webb)
 "Light of the Stable" - 3.06 (Steve Rhymer, Elizabeth Rhymer)
 "I Believe in Father Christmas" - 3.28 (Greg Lake, Peter Sinfield)
 "A Winter's Tale" - 3.58 (Mike Batt, Tim Rice)
 "Thirty-Two Feet and Eight Little Tails" - 0.51 (John Redmond, James Cavanaugh, Frank Weldon)

Personnel

Musicians 
Elaine Paige - vocals
Mel Collins - tenor saxophone
Mitch Dalton - guitars
Mary Hopkin - backing vocals
Mini Pops (Richard Agg, Kelly East, Paul Hardy, Zoe Hart, Robin Wilson, Jessica Visconti) - backing vocals
Steve Pearce - bass guitar
Tim Rice - Santa voiceover on "Thirty-Two Feet and Eight Little Tails"
Robin Smith -  musical director, keyboards
Ali Thomson - backing vocals
Graham Ward - drums
Mari Wilson - backing vocals

The Astarte Orchestra was led by Gavyn Wright

Production
Producer and Mixer - Tony Visconti
Mixer - Sid Wells
Assistant Engineer - Sam Smith
Orchestral Arrangements and "Coventry Carol" Arrangement - Robin Smith
Strings Arrangements - Tony Visconti
"Ave Maria" Producer and Arranger - Mike Batt

Certifications and sales

References

Elaine Paige albums
1986 Christmas albums
Albums produced by Tony Visconti
Christmas albums by English artists
Pop Christmas albums
Warner Music Group albums